Ultrabeat are a British electronic dance music group from Liverpool, England formed in 2002. Originally consisting of vocalist and producer Mike Di Scala and producers Ian Redman and Chris Henry, Ultrabeat first emerged with their cover of the Force & Styles song "Pretty Green Eyes", which peaked at number two on the UK Singles Chart 2003. They released further singles including top forty hits such as "Feelin' Fine", "Better than Life" and "Elysium (I Go Crazy)", followed by their début album Ultrabeat: The Album in 2007, which peaked at number eight on the UK Albums Chart

In 2008, Ultrabeat released "Discolights", a collaboration with Darren Styles and Danny P, which peaked at number twenty three on the UK Singles Chart. Their second album, The Weekend Has Landed, released in 2009 and peaked at number twenty nine on the UK Albums Chart.

History

2002–2003: Formation and early recordings
Prior to forming Ultrabeat, Mike Di Scala, Chris Henry and Ian Redman were DJ’s (Disc Jokey’s) in Liverpool and mixed in the same circle of friends. With a common interest in late-1990s happy hardcore music, the group decided to enter studio for recording sessions. Initially, their productions were bootleg versions of old happy hardcore tracks recorded in order to improve their DJ sets. In 2002 Ultrabeat produced their first remixes and the first record by the group was a double A-side 12-inch single "Sonic Burnin'"/"Boomcore" released on  label BCD Records in January 2003. Di Scala was previously a member of Rezonance Q, who had chart success with their cover of "Someday" by Mariah Carey. Di Scala played his record label Ultrabeat's demo of "Pretty Green Eyes", a cover of Force & Styles, and following this they were also signed by the label.

2003–2007: Ultrabeat: The Album era
"Pretty Green Eyes" went on to peak at Number #2 on the UK Singles Chart in August 2003, behind "Breathe" by Blu Cantrell featuring Sean Paul. It was playlisted on most radio stations including BBC Radio 1, and was performed live on Top of the Pops. The following single was "Feelin' Fine" which peaked at number twelve on the UK Singles Chart in December 2003. Their next release was "Better Than Life", which was issued the following year and peaked at number twenty three on the UK Singles Chart.

Their next single, "Feel It with Me", was released ten months after "Better than Life", and peaked at number fifty five on the UK Singles Chart in 2005. An album (originally titled Better than Life: The Album) was expected to be released around this time, although this never materialised.

In April 2006 "Elysium (I Go Crazy)" was released and peaked at number thirty eight on the UK Singles Chart. This song, which sampled Scott Brown's "Elysium", featured Rebecca Rudd on vocals for the first time with Ultrabeat. "Elysium (I Go Crazy)" was played on TV music channels more frequently than "Feel It with Me" and was voted number one on MTV's 'Galaxy Chart'.

Their sixth single was a collaboration with Darren Styles, "Sure Feels Good", and was released in August 2007. It peaked at number fifty one on the UK Singles Chart. It was the second single featuring Rudd and along with "Elysium (I Go Crazy)" was the second collaboration with another hardcore artist. In September 2007 the band released their album, Ultrabeat: The Album, which peaked at number eight on the UK Albums Chart. At that time band undertook a national tour in support of Cascada (who are also on the AATW label). Their seventh single, "I Wanna Touch You", was released on 4 February 2008.

2008–present: The Weekend Has Landed era
A new single "Discolights" was released in June 2008. An original release date of 12 January 2009 was set for the album, but despite this, it has been leaked onto the internet on various file sharing platforms.

The first single from the album was Discolights. It peaked at number twenty three on the UK Singles Chart. The second single from the album was Never Ever, which did not achieve a peak on the UK Singles Charts.
The third single was Starry Eyed Girl, which, like the majority of the album, did not achieve a peak on the UK Singles Chart, and the fourth is Use Somebody, a cover of Kings of Leon's track from their multi-platinum album Only by the Night. The album was released on 26 October 2009 and includes 18 tracks plus a chronology DVD of all of their music videos, including Pretty Green Eyes, Feelin' Fine, The Stalker, Discolights and more.

Following The Weekend Has Landed album, Ultrabeat released three singles, "Bring It Back", "You Will See" and "Rising". A new song "Rain Stops" appeared on Clubland X-Treme Hardcore 9 in 2013.

Other projects
The group produced a track called "Pumpanola" using the alias Hi-Flyerz which appeared on Clubland X-Treme in 2003. In 2012, they had a hit single with "Da Bop" using the alias WTF!, which samples the 1967 song "Our Neighbour" (Russian: "Наш сосед" nash sosed) by Russian singer Edita Piekha. Two songs recorded by the group using the name Steampunk, "Loki's Theme" and "Forever Loved", appeared on Clubland X-Treme Hardcore 9 in 2013.

Di Scala, Henry and Lee Butler recorded using several aliases such as 3 Amigos, King of Clubs and The Tranceriffs on BCD Records. Di Scala has also released music as CamelPhat with Dave Whelan. Chris Henry and Mike Di Scala have also recorded using the name M&C Project, releasing songs "Coming Back" (2005), a cover of Siedah Garrett's "Do You Want It Right Now" (2006) and "Magic Touch" (2007). Chris Henry is also a member of N-Force, with Jorg Schmid.

Members

 Chris Henry – disc jockey, producer (2002–present)
 Ian Redman – disc jockey, producer (2002–present)
 Mike Di Scala – vocals, producer (2002–2013)

Discography

Studio albums

Singles

Remixes

Music videos

References

External links
 

2002 establishments in England
English dance music groups
English house music groups
Musical groups established in 2002
Musical groups from Liverpool
Record production teams
All Around the World Productions artists